The women's 5000 metres at the 2021 World Athletics U20 Championships was held at the Kasarani Stadium on 22 August.

Records

Results
The final was held on 22 August at 17:10.

References

5000 metres
Long distance running at the World Athletics U20 Championships
U20